Oesilo is a small town (Suco Bobometo, Oesilo subdistrict) in the East Timor exclave of Oecusse. It is located in the southeast of the exclave, close to the border with Indonesia.

References 
 Wheeler, T. (2004) East Timor. Footscray, VIC: Lonely Planet.

Populated places in Oecusse